Proculus (died c. 281) was a Roman usurper against Emperor Probus in 280.

Proculus (or Procolo in Italian) may also refer to:

Proculus (jurist) (fl. 1st century AD), Ancient Roman jurist, namesake of the Proculeian school of law
Proculus Julius, a person in the legendary history of the Roman Kingdom
Saint Proculus of Verona (d. c. 320 AD), first bishop of Verona
Saint Proculus of Pozzuoli (d. c. 305 AD)
Saint Proculus of Bologna (Saint Proculus the Soldier) (d. c. 304 AD)
Saint Proculus of Narni or Terni, martyred in the sixth century by order of the Gothic king Totila

Churches
San Procolo, Bologna
San Procolo, Florence
San Procolo, Verona

See also
Proculus (praenomen), a Roman praenomen
Saint Proclus of Constantinople, 5th century Archbishop of Constantinople
Pontius Pilate's wife, sometimes called Saint Procula